Olga Bell (born Olga Balashova, 3 October 1983) is an American musician, music producer, composer, and singer-songwriter. She was born in Moscow, Russia, raised in Anchorage, Alaska and is currently based in Brooklyn, New York. A classically trained pianist and self-taught electronic music producer, she has worked in a wide range of genres, including classical, electronic pop, and Russian folk. Best known for Край (Krai), a tribute to her Russian heritage, and Diamonite, an album she produced with Gunnar Olsen and Jason Nazary under the moniker BELL, she has also played in Chairlift and Dirty Projectors and collaborated with Tom Vek under the name Nothankyou.  In 2016, Bell released her third studio album Tempo.

Early life
Bell started playing the piano at age seven, after moving with her mother from Moscow to Anchorage, Alaska and made her public debut two years later. Bell's studied under Svetlana Velichko, a former Moscow Conservatory professor and Samuel Feinberg student, and at age twelve performed an original composition for piano and orchestra with her hometown Anchorage Symphony. At sixteen, she performed as a concerto soloist with the Anchorage Civic Orchestra. In high school, she attended the Aspen Music Festival and School on a scholarship. She was also a fellow of The Banff Centre and Yale's Norfolk Festival, where she studied with Claude Frank and members of the Juilliard, Tokyo and St. Petersburg String Quartets.

Career

2005-13: Beginnings and Diamonite
In August 2005, having graduated from the New England Conservatory but not been accepted to the Juilliard School's graduate program, Bell moved to New York City to pursue music outside the classical realm. She bought a laptop and started recording herself, singing into the built-in mic and making beats. From 2005 to 2010, Bell split her time between piano teaching and theater accompaniment gigs and pursuing her new musical project on the side.

As she wrote new material for the project, she performed at open mics and formed a band, BELL, with Jason Nazary, Mike Chiavaro, and Grey McMurray to perform the songs with her. In 2007, they self-produced and self-released the six-song Bell EP. In 2011, with Chiavaro and McMurray having left the band, Bell worked with Jason Nazary and Gunnar Olsen to produce and release her first full-length album, Diamonite.

Diamonite received positive critical reception, with The New York Times praising its "bubbly, glitchy electronic pop songs" driven by Bell's "powerful" voice. Consequence of Sound remarked that "while moments on Diamonite might recall other artists, the band never sounds imitative or even descendant of those influences".

Aside from her work on her own music, she produced remixes of tracks from Chairlift, Son Lux, Phoenix, Caroline Shaw, and others. In 2009 she was selected by composer Osvaldo Golijov and soprano Dawn Upshaw for a workshop and concert at Carnegie Hall.

2013-15: Край (Krai) and Nothankyou
In 2011, Bell received the Jerome Fund Grant from the American Composers Forum to aid in the completion of her first large-scale composition Край (Krai). The album was released to critical acclaim in 2014, following a sold-out live premiere at the Walker Art Center in Minneapolis. Though originally arranged for a twelve-piece electro-acoustic ensemble, it has also been adapted for solo voice with orchestra. Край was considered "fresh and new" by The Daily Telegraph.

During the same period as Крайs recording, Bell pursued side project Nothankyou''' with British musician Tom Vek, releasing three dance tracks between 2012-14 through Moshi Moshi Records and independently on Soundcloud. In 2013, she directed a video for their single Oyster.

From 2011 to 2013, Bell toured as a keyboardist and vocalist for Chairlift and Dirty Projectors.

2015-present: Incitation and Tempo
In mid-2015, Bell toured with Son Lux and premiered live versions of songs from Incitation, an EP she released on One Little Indian Records later that year, and Tempo, a full-length album to be released the following year.

On 12 August 2015, Nowness premiered the video for "Goalie", the last track on Incitation, which Bell co-directed with Christina Ladwig. Bell also worked with Noah Kalina to produce a lyric video for the EP's title track. Incitation was released on 16 October 2015. Pitchfork compared it to works by FKA Twigs and Björk, saying it "has an economy of purpose and more serious bent than her previous electronic work" and praising its "melismatic melodies and damaged electronic architecture" while also lamenting that it "hints in plenty of promising directions but hesitates from going all the way toward them."

On 9 March 2016, Bell released "Randomness", which Pitchfork named Best New Track. After releasing videos for "Randomness" and "ATA", Bell announced that Tempo, her third full-length album would be released on 27 May 2016. On Tempo, Bell explored dance music genres in order to create a record "first for the body, then for the mind." The Quietus said it "takes the recognisable features of a genre and subverts them, playing on our conceptions of musical familiarity and never letting the audience grow complacent."

In the summer of 2016, Bell toured in the U.S. and Europe supporting Chairlift, Empress Of, and Yeasayer.

Discography

Studio albums
 Diamonite (as BELL) (2011) – CD, digital
 Край (Krai) (2014) – 12" vinyl, CD, digital – New Amsterdam Records, One Little Indian Records
 Tempo (2016) – One Little Indian Records

EPs
 Bell EP (as BELL) (2007) – CD, digital
 Incitation EP (2015) – 12" vinyl, CD, digital – One Little Indian Records

Singles
 Magic Tape (as BELL) (2009) – 7" vinyl, CD, digital – twosyllable records
 Dialtone (as BELL) (2012) – digital
 Know Yourself / Oyster Single (with Tom Vek as Nothankyou) (2013) – 7" vinyl, digital – Moshi Moshi Records
 Randomness (2016) – digital – One Little Indian Records
 ATA'' (2016) – digital – One Little Indian Records

References

External links
 
 YouTube
 Bandcamp
Olga Bell BELL (Music Fashion Magazine, 2009)
An Interview with Olga Bell (American Composers Forum, 2014)
Interview with Olga Bell (MaxTotskywillbreakyourlegs, 2014)
Olga Bell (The Great Discontent, 2012)
Interview: Olga Bell (Loud And Quiet, 2014)
“Reckoning with my Russianness”: Olga Bell on Origin/Outcome (Walker Art Center, 2014)
Nika Danilova (Zola Jesus) Talks Olga Bell’s Krai (The Talk House, 2014)

21st-century American composers
Russian composers
Singers from Moscow
Musicians from Anchorage, Alaska
1983 births
Living people
Russian emigrants to the United States
Dirty Projectors members
21st-century Russian singers